The 2019 opening of regular sessions of the National Congress of Argentina took place on March 1, 2019. It was a speech delivered by president Mauricio Macri at the National Congress of Argentina.

Contents and delivery

Economy
Mauricio Macri acknowledged that the economy was not doing well, and attributed it to the 2018 capital flight, the drought that reduced the soy exports, and the Notebook scandal. He also pointed that inflation decreased and that 700,000 new jobs were created.

Crime
Mauricio Macri pointed a bill to amend the Penal Code of Argentina, considering that the current one would be outdated and of limited use. He also proposed to reduce the age of criminal responsibility from 16 to 15 years. He also praised the work of his government against crime and illegal drug trade.

Responses
The opposing legislators placed banners in protest at their seats. Kirchnerite legislators used banners proposing the hashtag "Hay otro camino", in reference to the 2019 Argentine general election. Left wing parties used their banners to protest the IMF loan, the firings at some firms, and the role of the United States in the 2019 Venezuelan presidential crisis.

References

External links

 Full speech 

2019 in Argentina
2019 speeches
March 2019 events in Argentina
Openings of regular sessions of the National Congress of Argentina
Presidency of Mauricio Macri